Chilean-Romanian relations are foreign relations between Chile and Romania. Diplomatic relations between both countries were established on February 5, 1925. Embassies were established in each other's countries that year but the bilateral relations were interrupted in 1943 because of World War II.

In 1965, the diplomatic relations were renewed. Even though most of the Eastern Bloc countries broke their relations with Chile after 1973, Romania refused to sever diplomatic relations.

Chile has an embassy in Bucharest and honorary consulates in Braşov and Cluj-Napoca. Romania has an embassy in Santiago.

See also 
 Foreign relations of Chile
 Foreign relations of Romania

References

External links 
  Chilean Foreign Ministry about relations with Romania (in Spanish)
 Chilean embassy in Bucharest (in Spanish and Romanian)
  Romanian embassy in Santiago de Chile (in Spanish)

 
Romania
Bilateral relations of Romania